Joseph Banchong Aribang (May 27, 1927 – September 1, 2012) was the Roman Catholic bishop of the Roman Catholic Diocese of Nakhon Sawan, Thailand.

Ordained to the priesthood in 1956, Banchong Aribang was named bishop in 1976 and resigned in 1998.

Notes

20th-century Roman Catholic bishops in Thailand
1927 births
2012 deaths